Chibli Mallat (May 10, 1960) is a Lebanese international lawyer, legal scholar, and a former candidate for presidency in Lebanon.

Career

Lawyer and law professor
In his law practice, he is best known for bringing the case of Victims of Sabra and Shatila v. Ariel Sharon et al., under the law of universal jurisdiction in Belgium, where his clients won a judgment on 12 February 2003 against the accused before a change in Belgian law removed the jurisdiction of the court. Other cases he pursued included one against Saddam Hussein, who was the object of an international campaign initiated in 1995 by Mallat with officials in Kuwait, London and Washington that developed into INDICT, a nongovernmental organisation he helped found in Britain in 1996. By 1998, INDICT had received open support in the American Congress and in the British Parliament, and was embraced by then US President Bill Clinton and British Prime Minister Tony Blair. The campaign laid the ground for a case against Saddam Hussein in Belgium in 2002, and his eventual trial in Iraq in 2005. A third case was won against Muammar Gaddafi in Beirut courts for the families of the historic leader of the Shi'i community Musa al-Sadr and his two companions, journalist Abbas Badreddin and cleric Muhammad Ya`qub, who disappeared in Libya upon their official invitation by Gaddafi in August 1978. Mallat also helped establish the Middle East regional office of Amnesty International in Beirut in 1999 for which his law firm has acted since as legal counsel. First led by directors Kamel Labidi and Ahmad Karaoud, both former prisoners of opinion in Tunisia, the regional office formed an inspiring precedent to a multitude of civil society organizations across the Middle East focusing on the promotion of human rights, accountability, and the abolition of the death penalty.

Founded by his father Wajdi Mallat in Beirut in 1949, Mallat Law Offices is one of the oldest law firms in the Middle East, recognized for important successes in domestic litigation, including succession and estates, administrative, and business law. The practise continued and was developed internationally upon Mallat's return to Beirut from London in 1995. In addition to victims of mass crime, the firm's clients include governments, embassies, multi-national companies and business and political leaders.

Academic career
Educated in Lebanon, the United States and Europe, Mallat received his PhD from the law department of London University's School of Oriental and African Studies (SOAS) in 1990. He held research and teaching positions at the University of California Berkeley School of Law (Boalt Hall) in 1984-85 and at the School of Oriental and African Studies, where as a lecturer in Islamic Law he received his first tenured position in 1992. He taught at the Islamic University in Lebanon in 1995-96, and was twice visiting professor at the University of Lyon and at the University of Virginia School of Law. He was also Senior Schell Fellow at Yale Law School's International Human Rights Center and a Kluge scholar at the Library of Congress. In 2000, he received professorial tenure at Saint Joseph University (USJ) in Lebanon and was appointed a year later to the first EU Jean Monnet Chair in European Law in the Middle East. In 2004, the EU Commission bestowed its 'Center of Excellence' label to the Chair and the Directorate-General of the Education and Culture at the EU Commission honored it as 'A Success Story' in 2007.

In 2006-2007, he spent one year at Princeton University where he was a Visiting Professor at the Woodrow Wilson School, Fellow in the Program in Law and Public Affairs, Fellow in the University Center for Human Values, Fellow in the Program in International and Regional Studies and a Distinguished Visitor in the Bobst Center for Peace and Justice. A tenured professor of Middle Eastern Politics and Law at the University of Utah since 2007 and Presidential Professor since 2009, Mallat was appointed in 2011 Custodian of the Two Holy Mosques Visiting Professor of Islamic Legal Studies at Harvard Law School. He taught in Fall 2012 at Yale Law School as Visiting Professor of Law and Oscar M. Ruebhausen Distinguished Senior Fellow. In Spring 2015, he was a Visiting Professor at the Ecole des Hautes Etudes en Sciences Sociales (EHESS) in Paris. In 2017, he resigned his full-time positions at Saint Joseph's University and at the University of Utah, but remained on the University of Utah's law faculty as Emeritus Presidential Professor of Law.

Human rights and politics
Mallat has been active in human rights and democratic advocacy since his high school days. His main focus since 1982 was Iraq as key to change in the Middle East, and he founded the International Committee for a Free Iraq (ICFI) in 1991 with Edward Mortimer and Ahmad Chalabi to seek the end of dictatorship in Baghdad. The ICFI brought together about a hundred Iraqi and international personalities, including leading US senators like Claiborne Pell, then Chairman of the Senate Foreign Relations Committee, and John McCain, as well as British MP David Howell, then chairman of the Select Committee on Foreign Affairs, and respected Arab public figures like Saad Eddin Ibrahim and Adonis. Many of the Committee's Iraqi members became the leaders of Iraq after the end of Baathist dictatorship in 2003, including Mohammed Bahr al-Uloum as the first president of the Iraqi Governing Council, Jalal Talibani as president and Hoshyar Zebari as Foreign Minister. Mallat was opposed to the US-led invasion, and sought with the support of then US Deputy Secretary of Defense Paul Wolfowitz an alternative Security Council Resolution that would have declared Saddam Hussein's presidency illegitimate and advocated the deployment of human rights monitors in Iraq during the transition to democracy. He visited Iraq in late 2003 and again in early 2004 to accelerate the recognition of the Iraqi Governing Council as the official government of Iraq, a move opposed by Paul Bremer and Kofi Annan. In 2005, he declined the Iraqi government's invitation to head the tribunal that eventually tried Saddam Hussein. In 2008-10, Mallat was senior legal advisor to the Global Justice Project: Iraq, which he initiated with Hiram Chodosh, the dean of the law school at the University of Utah. The large team of scholars, operating as legal think-tank in Baghdad, advised the Iraqi government on legislation, constitutional review, and treaties. Mallat was invited to sit on the Constitutional Review Committee led by Humam Hamoudi, and completed with the Committee a revision of the Constitution in October 2009. In Summer 2014, he helped the Iraqi president Fouad Masum and Parliamentary Speaker Salim al-Jabouri construct the constitutional argument that put an end to the Prime Ministership of Nouri al-Maliki. In 2016, he helped found Humanist Lebanon, organizing regular demonstrations in the centre of Beirut to end the presidential void in the name of the Constitution.

Presidential campaign
In his native Lebanon, Mallat ran for president in 2005-2006 in an unprecedented challenge to the incumbent, Emile Lahoud, who had relied on the Damascus government of Bashar al-Asad to force an unconstitutional extension of his mandate. During the Cedar Revolution which was triggered by the assassination of the president's main opponent, Rafiq al-Hariri, Mallat was active in street protests and in the leadership, where his central advocacy was the establishment of an international, hybrid tribunal to arrest and try the assassins of Hariri and scores of other victims - eventually known as the Special Tribunal for Lebanon, and the removal of the 'coercively-extended president' from power.' Mallat's campaign was initiated in November 2005 to push a fractured and direction-less revolution towards its active materialisation in a presidency 'that looked like the people who made it.'

Denigrated by some as 'quixotic',  the campaign was received in the local, regional and international media as a breakthrough for Arab democracy in its direct, people-based nonviolent challenge to dictators for life. Over a period of seven months, Mallat's team took its message to several cities and villages of Lebanon, and was supported by unprecedented mobilisation of the Lebanese diaspora, especially in the US. Internationally, the campaign culminated in a Security Council Presidential Statement that undermined the legitimacy of Emile Lahoud, and translated in a mass popular meeting on 14 March 2006 with a single motto: 'Lahoud must go'.  As 'the primary architect' of Lahoud's demise,  Mallat joined with the leadership of the March 14 coalition to develop his constitutional, nonviolent plan to replace Lahoud by a freely elected president. Despite his agreement at the time with key Lebanese 14 March leaders, especially Walid Jumblat, his plan was scuttled by their hesitation, and by the pro-Syrian speaker's call for a dialogue in which presidential change was drowned amongst several secondary issues. With the political deadlock that ensued, Mallat predicted a new bout of 'immense violence' descending on the country.

When the war against Israel was triggered by Hizbullah on 12 July 2006, Mallat was forced to interrupt his campaign on the ground. He denounced the attack of Hizbullah and debated its foreign affairs representative on television in the midst of the bombardments. Soon after the ceasefire, which he had helped engineer through an active collaboration with the Lebanese government's acting foreign minister, he accepted an offer by Princeton University and left for the US with his family. At Princeton, he completed six books, including two on the campaign.

Middle East Nonviolent Revolution
Mallat remains actively engaged for Middle East democracy as scholar and activist. In pursuit of radical nonviolent change, he founded in 2009 Right to Nonviolence, an international NGO that advocates and supports nonviolence, constitutional reform and judicial accountability. Right to Nonviolence has been active in the Arab Spring, which Mallat prefers to call the 'Middle East Nonviolent Revolution' to englobe Israel and Iran. As constitutional expert, he assisted with the early constitutional amendments in Egypt after the removal of Husni Mubarak.
In February 2011, he was asked by the Bahraini leadership and opposition, and the US State Department, to assist in efforts to jumpstart the political process by producing a 'Constitutional Options' paper. Amidst an increase of tension on the street, the hardliners in government had decided to go for an all out repression of the Pearl Revolution. The trip to Manama to restart the dialogue was interrupted on 13 March 2011 as he was boarding the plane. He visited Libya and Yemen in the summer of 2013 and assisted the respective UN special envoys, Tarek Mitri and Jamal Benomar, on constitutional and accountability matters.

Over the years, Mallat developed a theory of nonviolence combined with his work as a lawyer seeking justice for the most heinous political crimes known as crimes against humanity. In addition to the case against Sharon, which showed for the first time to an Arab and international audience that nonviolence may be a far more effective tool than war, he helped expand the field of judicial accountability as an important avenue for victims to stand up against dictators and bring them to account. With international action against Saddam Hussein, Muammar Gaddafi, Omar Bashir yielding tangible albeit uneven results, the scene was set for the trial of Tunisian president Zine El Abidine Ben Ali, Egyptian president Husni Mubarak, and the falling dictators of the Middle East Revolution. He denounced the extrajudicial execution of Gaddafi, and the violent bent of the Libyan Revolution. With the setbacks of the revolution across the region, Mallat argued for the continued advocacy of nonviolence as the philosophy of historical change by "keeping the flame alive".

He developed a more systematic theory of nonviolence as the anima of historical change in Philosophy of Nonviolence, a book published in 2015. He has been active in the Lebanese Revolution which started in November 2019, in particular through Rally for the Revolution, known by its Arabic acronym as TMT.

Writings
Mallat is the author or editor of some forty books, and has published dozens of scholarly articles and book chapters. He has been a frequent contributor to Arabic, French and English dailies and served as op-ed consultant and legal editor for The Daily Star (Beirut) in 1996-1998 and in 2009-2010. He was a regular columnist in al-Nahar (Beirut), al-Hayat (London), The Daily Star (Beirut), Al-Ahram (Cairo), L'Orient-Le Jour (Beirut), and a guest columnist in the New York Timess blog Line of Fire during the Hizbullah-Israel war in July–August 2006. He views himself as the eclectic disciple of a number of twentieth century 'maverick thinkers'. Mallat's worldview draws on the encyclopaedic, articulate understanding of society by French banker and sociologist Robert Fossaert; the conceptualisation of the courts' role in society in the works of John Hart Ely and the American constitutional tradition, the progressive humanism of Lebanese leader Kamal Jumblat; the aggiornamento of the Islamic legal tradition by the Iraqi Mohammad Baqir al-Sadr; and Gilles Deleuze's creative, multi-layered philosophy.

Collaborative work
Academic collaborative work has seen him serving as a joint founder and general editor of the Yearbook of Islamic and Middle Eastern Law, now at Brill, a series on 'Horizons Européens' for the Centre d'Etudes de l'Union Européenne at Saint Joseph University, and a series on Islamic and Middle Eastern Law at Kluwer Law International as director of the  Center of Islamic and Middle Eastern Law at the School of Oriental and African Studies. He has also contributed several entries and chapters to specialised encyclopedias of Islamic and Middle Eastern Studies, and of comparative law.<ref>'Comparative law and the Islamic (Middle Eastern) legal culture', in Mathias Reimann and Reinhard Zimmermann eds., Oxford Handbook of Comparative Law, OUP, 2006, 609-639; 'Islam and the constitutional order', in Michel Rosenfeld and Andras Sajo eds, Oxford Handbook of Comparative Constitutional Law, Oxford University Press, 2012, 1287-1303 (Also in Japanese, published 2011 tr. and ed. Makoto Mizutani); Emtries 'Islamic Law in Arab Countries', 'Commercial Law: Islamic Law (Modern)', 'Contract: Contracts and Unilateral Acts in Islamic Law ', 'International Law: Islamic Public Law', 'Constitutional Law: Constitutions and Constitutional Law in Islamic Law: Overview and The Arab Countries',  in Stanley Katz general ed., Baber Johansen, ME and Islam ed., The Encyclopedia of Legal History, Oxford UP 2009; 'Attorney', entry in Encyclopaedia of Islam 3d ed., 2008; 'Islamic Legal Theory- Introducing usul al-fiqh, entry in IVR Encyclopaedia of Legal Theory and Philosophy of Law, 2005;  'Muhammad Baqer al-Sadr', 'Iraq', 'Contracts', entries in Encyclopaedia of the Modern Islamic World, Oxford University Press, 1995.</ref> In 2014, he helped found and became the commissioning editor of Bada'e', a niche publishing house of books in Arabic, French and English on the Middle East.

Islamic and Middle Eastern law
In his work on Islamic and Middle Eastern law, he has engaged scholarship from the West and from the Middle East in a search for a common language of human rights and the rule of law to be conveyed from within the uniquely rich legal tradition of the Middle East from Hammurabi to the present. His first book, the Renewal of Islamic Law, which focused on the legal works of the most innovative Islamic scholar of the 20th century, the Iraqi Mohammad Baqir al-Sadr, received the North America Middle East Studies Association's annual prize, the Albert Hourani Book Award. Its Arabic version, published in 1998, circulated underground in Iraq until the demise of Saddam Hussein in 2003, and was reprinted several times since. The book was reviewed in over a hundred academic and press outlets, and revealed to the West a humanist scholarship at the highest intellectual level in Najaf.

His Introduction to Middle Eastern Law, the result of twenty years of research, appeared in 2007, and expanded the field of Islamic law to include the Middle East pre-Islamic legal tradition as an important component for legal research, and to prominently feature case law as a novel and essential focus to understand the law applied in everyday's life. For the classical period of Islam, it includes archival work on the court registers systematically analysed for the first time from a legal perspective. In the modern period, the Introduction covers the main fields of law in the operation of Middle Eastern courts from Pakistan to Morocco.

European and international law
In European and international law, his writings have focused on the formation of the European Union with a particular attention to the shortcomings of the institutional structure in the EU's democratic deficit, the deadlocks of the exit mechanisms for nonconforming countries, including the Euro, and the rise of 'the Euro-Mediterranean continent'. In international law, he uses the Middle East as the privileged terrain for an understanding of the interaction between international criminal law, diplomacy and politics, especially through his representation of victims of crimes against humanity in Iraq, Lebanon, Israel-Palestine and Libya.

 Philosophy of Nonviolence 
In his more theoretical work on law and nonviolence, Mallat seeks to articulate the difficult relation between the inherent violence of the democratic state and the search for Kantian perpetual peace. This search is informed by nonviolent practice in the 2005 Lebanese Cedar Revolution and in subsequent mass upheavals of the Middle East: from the Green Revolution in Iran in 2009 to the revolutions that began in Tunisia in January 2011. He continues to seek success in nonviolence against dictatorship through a declared involvement with oppositional leadership, human rights colleagues, and decision-makers across the world, some organised through Right to Nonviolence.

His Philosophy of Nonviolence was launched in Venice at a Yale law school seminar in January 2015, and he has since engaged a varied audience in a debate on nonviolence in special lectures and seminars across the world, focusing on Arab media to disseminate the advocacy. This included daily papers, the main Syrian opposition television station and SkyArabia news in Abu Dhabi.  Dedicated lectures were given in Lebanon, Switzerland, the US, Germany, and Malaysia. In October 2017, he collaborated with Adam Roberts and several research centers in Beirut and Tripoli to engage the public with nonviolence and civil resistance in the Arab Spring. He considers the Lebanese upheaval which started in November 2019 as another phase of the nonviolent revolution in the Middle East, with characteristic women leadership and a conscious effort not to be drawn into bloodshed.

Literature and poetry
Mallat grew up in a family steeped in a tradition of literature and law. His namesake grandfather was known across the Arab world as 'the Poet of the Cedars'. His granduncle Tamer Mallat was a judge and a poet, whose decisions and poetry he rediscovered and published; he also edited a selection of his father's writings in a bilingual French and Arabic book. With his son Tamer, he published an illustrated book for children in 1997, Aventures a Beyrouth.

Private life
He is the son of Nouhad Diab and Wajdi Mallat, the first president of the Lebanese Constitutional Council (Arabic المجلس الدستوري) of Lebanon, from 1994 to 1997, and has three sisters, Manal, Raya and Janane. He is married to Nayla Chalhoub, and they have two adult sons, Tamer and Wajdi.

PublicationsBooks

Boussole et autres journalismes, Dar al-Bada'e', Beirut, 2019.

'An Kamal Junblat wa min-wahyih (On Kamal Joumblat), Dar al-Bada'e', Beirut, 2018.

Philosophy of nonviolence: Revolution, constitutionalism, and justice beyond the Middle East, Oxford University Press, New York 2015.

Democracy in fin-de-siècle America,  Dar al-Bada'e', Beirut, 2016. Translated and revised English version of Al-Dimuqratiyya fi amirka, introduction by Ghassan Tueni, Dar al-Nahar, Beirut, 2001.

Introduction to Middle Eastern law, Oxford University Press, Oxford 2007, paperback edition with new preface, Oxford 2009.

Iraq: Guide to law and policy, Aspen/Kluwer Law International, Austin, 2009.

March 2221. Lebanon's Cedar Revolution- An essay on justice and non-violence, [Lir], Beirut, 2007.

Presidential choices, Beirut 1998, published in Arabic at Dar al-Nahar (Al-ri'asa al-lubnaniyya bayn al-ams wal-ghad), French (Défis présidentiels), and English.

The Middle East into the 21st Century, Garnet, Reading 1996. (paperback published in 1997; US edition in 1998; serialised in part in Arabic dailies).

The Renewal of Islamic law: Muhammad Baqer as-Sadr, Najaf, and the Shi'i International, Cambridge University Press (Middle East Library), 1993, paperback 2004. Also published in Arabic, Bahasa Indonesian and Turkish.

Books from the presidential campaign

Presidential talk, Dar al-Jadid, Beirut, 2008. Major speeches, interviews and lectures on the campaign trail (November 2005-June 2006).

Presidential papers, 2nd ed. Beirut January 2006. (issues, policies, achievements)

Al-barnamaj al-ri'asi (Presidential program), in Arabic, French and English.

Free and fair presidential elections, dossier published online.

An international tribunal for all, dossier published online.

A Compelling presidency, The Mallat campaign in world news, Beirut, April 2006. (compilation of profiles in Arab and international press).

Choice of edited books

Aux antipodes de l'Union Européenne: l'Islande et le Liban (with David Thor Bjorgvinsson), Beirut and Brussels, Bruylant, 2008.

From Baghdad to Beirut: Festschrift in honor of John Donohue (with Leslie Tramontini), German Orient Institute, Beirut 2007, 502pp.

L'Union Européenne et le Moyen-Orient: Etat des Lieux, Beirut, Presses de l'Université Saint Joseph, 2004.

Dossier sur l'Abolition de la peine de mort, Beirut, Université Saint-Joseph, 2003.

Yearbook of Islamic and Middle Eastern Law, Vols. 1-5: 1994-98 (with E. Cotran), Kluwer Law International

Water in the Middle East: Legal, Political and Commercial Implications (with J.A. Allan), I.B. Tauris, July 1995.(Arabic translation, Damascus 1998)

Islamic Family Law (with Jane Connors), Graham and Trotman, London, 1990.

Islamic Law and Finance, Centre of Near and Middle Eastern Studies, S.O.A.S., April 1988; new enlarged edition, Graham and Trotman, London, September 1988.

References

External links
 Mallat Law Offices Homepage
 TMT (tajammu` muwakabat al-thawra, تجمّع مواكبة الثورة).
 Global Justice Project: Iraq
 Right to Nonviolence الحقّ باللاعنف Homepage
 Constitutional Revolution & the Arab Spring Podcast of Chibli Mallat speaking at a conference by the Foundation for Law, Justice and Society, Oxford

Living people
Lebanese activists
Lebanese politicians
Lebanese lawyers
Academic staff of Saint Joseph University
1960 births
Alumni of SOAS University of London
UC Berkeley School of Law faculty
Academics of SOAS University of London